Razzaq Farhan Mussa  (born 1 July 1974) is a former Iraqi footballer and Olympic athlete who is currently the assistant manager of the Iraq national football team.

Razzaq Farhan is an instinctive goalscorer, whose speed in thought and deed makes up for his size and power. The Al-Quwa Al-Jawiya forward scored 24 goals in 60 games for the Iraqi national team after making his debut against Lebanon.

Farhan has played for several professional clubs, including Qatar Sports Club and Al-Faisaly (Amman). He was also part of the Olympic team in the 2004 Olympic Games, and scored the only goal in a losing semifinal match against Paraguay.

Farhan has more than 60 caps and scored 24 goals.

International goals
Scores and results list Iraq's goal tally first.

Coaching career

Al-Diwaniya FC

Farhan began his coaching career as an assistant to Radhi Shenaishil in Al-Quwa Al-Jawiya club, he worked in the club for almost 2 years. Farhan then went on his first coaching career with Al-Diwaniya FC which started in December 2018. Farhan had a good season compared to the club's bad supplies, In 30 games the club lost 7 games and won 8. Farhan had very impressive scores in some games like drawing with Al-Zawraa SC 3-3, then winning 3–2 in second round. Also winning Al-Talaba SC 2–0, winning 5th place Naft Maysan FC 3–1, and winning 6th place Al-Karkh SC 1–0. Very good home advantage for Farhan which was a reason in renewing the contract for the next season.

Managerial statistics

Honours

Club
Iraqi Premier League
Winner 1 
1996/97 with Al-Quwa Al-Jawiya
Iraq FA Cup
Winner 1 
1996/97 with Al-Quwa Al-Jawiya
Iraqi Elite Cup
 Winner 2
1996 and 1998 with Al-Quwa Al-Jawiya
Iraqi Super Cup
Winner 1
1997 with Al-Quwa Al-Jawiya
Bahraini Crown Prince Cup
Winner 1 
2005 with Riffa S.C.
Jordan FA Cup
Winner 1 
2008 with Al-Faisaly SC (Amman)
UAE President's Cup
Winner 1 
2003 with Al-Sharjah SCC

Country
2002 WAFF Champions
4th place in 2004 Athens Olympics
2005 West Asian Games Gold medallist.

References

External links
Profile on Iraqsport

Iraqi footballers
Iraqi expatriate footballers
Olympic footballers of Iraq
2004 AFC Asian Cup players
Footballers at the 2004 Summer Olympics
Sportspeople from Baghdad
Qatar SC players
Bahrain SC players
Iraqi expatriate sportspeople in Bahrain
Living people
Al-Shamal SC players
1974 births
Al-Baqa'a Club players
riffa SC players
Al-Quwa Al-Jawiya players
Ajman Club players
Dubai CSC players
Sharjah FC players
Baniyas Club players
Khor Fakkan Sports Club players
Expatriate footballers in Jordan
Expatriate footballers in Bahrain
Al-Faisaly SC players
UAE First Division League players
UAE Pro League players
Qatar Stars League players
Association football forwards
Iraq international footballers
Al-Karkh SC managers